Frumenta solanophaga is a moth in the family Gelechiidae. It was described by Adamski and Brown in 2002. It is found in Mexico (San Luis Potosi).

References

Gnorimoschemini
Moths described in 2002